John Henry Wilson (January 30, 1846 – January 14, 1923) was a U.S. Representative from Kentucky.

Born in Crab Orchard, Kentucky, Wilson pursued preparatory studies.
He graduated from Tusculum College in June 1870.  After this he studied law.

Wilson was admitted to the bar in September 1871 and commenced practice in Barbourville, Kentucky.
He was also greatly interested in agricultural pursuits and the construction of the Dixie Highway.
He served as member of the Kentucky State Senate from 1883 to 1887.

Wilson was elected as a Republican to the Fifty-first and Fifty-second Congresses (March 4, 1889 – March 3, 1893).
He was an unsuccessful candidate for reelection in 1892 to the Fifty-third Congress.
He resumed the practice of his profession in Barbourville, Kentucky.
He died in Louisville, Kentucky, January 14, 1923.
He was interred in Barbourville Cemetery.

References

1846 births
1923 deaths
Tusculum University alumni
Republican Party Kentucky state senators
Republican Party members of the United States House of Representatives from Kentucky
People from Lincoln County, Kentucky
People from Barbourville, Kentucky
19th-century American lawyers
19th-century American politicians
20th-century American lawyers
Kentucky lawyers